The Drexel Dragons college basketball team competes in the National Collegiate Athletic Association (NCAA) Division I, representing Drexel University in the Colonial Athletic Association. The Dragons have played their home games at the Daskalakis Athletic Center in Philadelphia, Pennsylvania since 1975.

Seasons

See also
List of Drexel Dragons men's basketball seasons

References

Drexel Dragons
Drexel Dragons basketball seasons